This is an incomplete list of schools in Denmark, listed by region.

Capital region
Bagsværd Kostskole og Gymnasium
Bornholms Erhvervsskole
Birkerød Gymnasium- HF, IB og Kostskole
Christianshavn School
Copenhagen International School
Efterslægten
Frederiksberg Gymnasium
Helsingør Gymnasium
Hillerød Ungdomscenter
Ishøj Gymnasium
Krebs School
Krogerup Højskole
Munkegaard School
N. Zahle's School
Nørre Gymnasium
Ørestad Gymnasium
Rygaards International School
Rysensteen Gymnasium
Sigerslevøster Privatskole
Skt. Josef's, Roskilde International School
Skt. Jørgens Gymnasium

Central Denmark
Grenaa Gymnasium & HF
Krabbesholm Højskole
Langkær Gymnasium & HF
Performers House
Ringkjøbing Gymnasium
Risskov skole
Samsø Højskole
Testrup Højskole
Vestbirk Højskole
Viborg Katedralskole

North Denmark
Aalborg Cathedral School
Aalborghus Gymnasium
EUC Nord
Limfjordsskolen
Tech College Aalborg
Hjørring Gymnasium

Southern Denmark
Brenderup Folk High School
International School of Southern Denmark (The Cosmo)
Kolding Gymnasium
Nordfyns Folkehøjskole
Nyborg Gymnasium
Ribe Katedralskole
Ryslinge Folk High School
Sabro Korsvejskolen
Sdr. Nærå Fri- og Efterskole
Svendborg Gymnasium
Vejle Idrætshøjskole
Glamsbjerg hf- vucfyn
Glamsbjerg fri- og efterskole

Zealand
Herlufsholm School
Kalundborg Gymnasium
Roskilde Gymnasium
Rødkilde Højskole
Skt. Josefs, Roskilde International School
Sorø Academy
Vallekilde Folk High School

Constituent countries

Faroe Islands
Føroya Studentaskúli og HF-Skeið

Greenland
Kangillinguit School

See also

Education in Denmark
List of universities in Denmark
 Open access in Denmark

 
Denmark
Denmark
Schools
Schools
Schools